is a 1998 arcade fighting game developed by Taito as the sequel to their 1995 title, Psychic Force. The game was first released in arcades in 1998 and was then ported a year later to the Dreamcast, becoming one of the console's earliest titles when it was released in Japan on March 4, 1999. A North American version was released on November 9, 1999 and a year later in Europe, distributed by Acclaim Entertainment but self-published by Taito.

This version features downgraded graphics, but includes several extra modes (such as the "Psy-Expand" mode), an animated FMV intro, and three returning characters from the original Psychic Force (Sonia, Brad and Genma) who had been omitted in Psychic Force 2012. In 2006, Psychic Force 2012 was re-released as part of an anniversary pack for the PlayStation 2 titled Psychic Force Complete, which also includes the original Psychic Force and a special exclusive remixed version of 2012 titled Psychic Force 2012 EX.

Location test for the Taito NESiCAxLive version occurred between November 2 and November 6 of 2012.

Gameplay

The fighting system of Psychic Force 2012 remains the same as its predecessor, but the control has been redefined and the balance has been adjusted while the playing mechanics of the previous game has been fleshed out and new ones have been introduced as well.

On the side of the screen are two bars (one for each player). Each bar is separated into 2 gauges, the Life Gauge and the Psycho Gauge. To execute most moves, you will deplete your Psycho Gauge. As your Life Gauge decreases, the space for your Psycho Gauge increases. Hence, your Psycho Gauge can go beyond 100% (max 200%) Above there's a Power Indicator. This indicator shows a number that represents the strength of the character (default is 100%, max 200%).

There are 4 walls of the cube (battle arena) that the characters can contact with. Note that finishing off the opponent with a special move during the last round will cause the opponent to be smashed out of the arena (most of the time). It only applies to the left and right sides.

A light attack will execute small projectiles from far away. These projectiles will not deplete your Psycho Gauge and are weak. A strong attack will fire a bigger projectile, and depletes your Psycho Gauge by 30%. When both characters are close together, the light and strong attacks will execute punches and kicks. The light attack can be pressed multiple times for a combo while the strong attack will deliver a powerful blow. As noted before, the strong attack will consume 30% of the Psycho Gauge. So when the Psycho Gauge is depleted, the character will fire small projectiles just like pressing the light attack from far away. Another thing to note is the two commands that are available for the first move of every character. As the strong attack will deliver a strong physical attack up close, the other will be used to fire a projectile.

Returning tactics from the first Psychic Force includes the Psycho Charge, Barrier Guard, the Normal Dash, and the Quick Dash while the new tactics introduced in Psychic Force 2012 includes the Retreat Barrier, which can interrupt attacks from the opponent, but it will not break combos as it just prevents the opponent from attacking you after being knocked away while it consumes 50% of the Psycho Gauge, a Slide Dash which allows the character to side-step into the opponent's defense, a Hyper Charge which increase the Psycho Gauge while depleting the Life Gauge though it helps raise the attack power, hence the purpose of the Power Indicator that appears at the top, a Psy-Impulse which is a form of counter-attacking in which the character can unleash a repelling force after being knocked into a wall by the opponent while it consumes 25% of the Psycho Gauge, and a Barrier Break in which a character can break through an opponent's barrier and cause damage, but the move can only be guarded by a normal guard and that it consumes 50% of the Psycho Gauge.

The Arcade Mode of Psychic Force 2012 has the playing character going through eight stages of combat against random opponents, being timed on how fast they can complete the game while the Story Mode has the playing character facing off against a specific set of opponents, with the addition of cut-scenes in order to advance the story of the playing character. Once the player reaches the eighth and final stage, they will battle against a specific final boss for their playing character and once the final boss is defeated, an ending will be presented for the playing character.

Story
Taking place two years after the events of Psychic Force, the sequel finds the world caught in the crossfire between two factions who vie for control over the Earth. Upon returning after his fateful past battle against his old friend Burn Griffiths, Keith Evans resurrects NOA as Neo NOA and once again resumes his conquest of establishing a utopia for united Psychiccers. Richard Wong, who had broken away from NOA, establishes his own group of Psychiccers known as "The Army" and seeks to eliminate Neo NOA in an attempt to conquer the world. As the two groups fight for control over the fate of the Earth, independent Psychiccers who find themselves being drawn into the conflict seek to hunt down members of Neo NOA and The Army in an attempt to find the truth and help locate their missing family and friends.

Characters

New
Psychic Force 2012 introduced seven characters new to the series. A few have similarity in fighting styles with a few of the previous cast.

 Might: The new lead character of the game. A young Psychiccer boy who has the ability to use the psychic power of lightning in battle. While Might enjoys his job in hunting down and killing Psychiccers as a Psychiccer Hunter, he begins to question why he takes up such an occupation.
 Patricia "Patty" Myers: A young Psychiccer girl who has the ability to use the psychic power of tone in battle. As a close friend of Might, Patty always watches over him and makes sure that he never gets himself into trouble. Aside from that, Patty is also on a personal mission to find and locate her missing mother.
 Carlo Belfrond: A well-suited and intellectual Psychiccer man who has the ability to use the psychic power of water in battle. Carlo, who serves as Keith's new subordinate in Neo NOA, helps supports Keith's dream of a Psychiccer-only utopia and, along with his younger sister Regina, vows to eliminate anyone who gets in the way of Neo NOA.
 Regina Belfrond: A beautiful Psychiccer woman who has the ability to use the psychic power of fire in battle. Much like her older brother Carlo, Regina is also a supporter of Keith's ambition and fights to make it come into reality itself.
 Gudeath: A ruthless Psychiccer man who has the ability to use the psychic power of gravity in battle. Brutal and merciless, Gudeath dislikes people who he deems as being weak, especially the Psychiccers of Neo NOA, and vows to eliminate them and anyone else in order to show off his superior power.
 Setsuna: A cold-hearted Psychiccer man who has the ability to use the psychic power of darkness in battle. While Setsuna serves The Army for the thrill of fighting powerful opponents, he plans on eliminating Wong so that he can take full control over the organization.
 Genshin Kenjoh: A Japanese Yamabushi  monk/priest who uses Shugendō magic in battle. Much like Genma from the first game, Genshin is convinced that Psychiccers are evil and he vows to eliminate each and every one of them while attempting to rescue a young Yamabushi  named Shiori from Wong and The Army.

Returning

Original
Original characters from Psychic Force with the exception of the Psychic Force 2 exclusive characters who are also members of the original cast.

 Burn Griffiths: The main protagonist of the series. Awakened from his frozen slumber for the past two years, Burn is ready and prepared to not only thwart the plans of both Neo NOA and The Army, but also to find and stop Keith so that he can convince him to give up his ambition of creating a Psychiccer-only world once again.
 Emilio Michaelov: Brainwashed by Wong to serve his army.
 Wendy Ryan: Having lost Sonia in the previous game, Wendy now searches for Burn, who mysteriously disappeared, and Emilio.
 Richard Wong: Now head of The Army which is opposing Neo NOA, Wong still plots for world domination.
 Gates Oltsman: Reprogrammed by Keith to serve Neo NOA, Gates is currently fighting for control.
 Keith Evans: The leader of Neo NOA who is still trying to create a utopia for Psychiccers, but at the same time, concerned about his friend, Burn, who he kept in a frozen slumber for the past two years.

Psychic Force 2 exclusive
Three characters were added to the PlayStation port of Psychic Force 2012, known as Psychic Force 2. They are characters from the original Psychic Force who never made it to the arcade or the Dreamcast version, though they lack a Story Mode.

 Sonia (Chris Ryan)
 Brad Kilsten
 Rokudo Genma

Windows version

This version includes features from the Dreamcast port of the game, and Glide/DirectX support.

The re-release version includes only the DirectX version of the game, and added a character gallery.

Reception
In Japan, Game Machine listed Psychic Force 2012 on their August 1, 1998 issue as being the second most-successful arcade game of the month.

Jeff Lundrigan reviewed the Dreamcast version of the game for Next Generation, rating it one star out of five, and stated that "A waste of money and time."

Reviews
Computer and Video Games (Dec, 1999)
Consoles Plus (Jan, 2000)
Game Revolution (Nov 01, 1999)
Futuregamez.net (Feb 26, 2000)
GameSpot (Mar 16, 1999)
Absolute Games (Jul 16, 1999)
IGN (Nov 09, 1999)
NowGamer (Oct 07, 1999)
Jeuxvideo.com (Mar 20, 2000)
Gaming Age (1999)
NowGamer (Oct 31, 1999)
Planet Dreamcast (Dec 01, 1999)
Revista Oficial Dreamcast (Jan, 2000)

References

External links
Gamespot Review of Psychic 2012
Unbalance Corporation page
Taito pages: Arcade, NESiCAxLive

1998 video games
Acclaim Entertainment games
Arcade video games
Dreamcast games
PlayStation (console) games
PlayStation 2 games
PlayStation Network games
Science fiction video games
Taito games
Fighting games
Video games about psychic powers
Video games scored by Masahiko Takaki
Video games scored by Tamayo Kawamoto
Video games scored by Yasuhisa Watanabe
Video games set in 2012
Works based on Square Enix video games
Video games developed in Japan